Thams is a surname. Notable people with the surname include:

Christian Thams (1867–1948), Norwegian architect, industrialist, businessman and diplomat
Jacob Tullin Thams (1898–1954), Norwegian ski jumper and sailor
Marentius Thams (1836–1907), Norwegian merchant and industrialist

See also
Tham, another surname